James Martin (born 13 March 1931) is a Scottish film and television actor. He played Eric in BBC's Still Game, a situation-comedy television series, in which he was one of the few actors who was actually a senior citizen.

Martin has also appeared in at least seven other television productions and five films. He also starred in the 2009 short film Relatively PC, a comedy directed by David Goodall. In 2014 he made a short appearance in episode 1x02 of Lovesick playing the main character's neighbour. He also appeared in Peter McDougall's Just Another Saturday (1975) under the name of Jimmy Martin.

Born in Partick in Glasgow, for many years Martin has lived in Musselburgh, East Lothian. Before working on Still Game, he was a helper working at Campie Primary School's after-school club in the town.

References

External links
 

1931 births
Living people
Scottish male film actors
Scottish male television actors
Male actors from Glasgow